Broken Barrier is a 1952 New Zealand film. It was directed and produced by John O'Shea (director) and Roger Mirams, and written by O'Shea. It starred Kay Ngarimu and Terence Bayler, and also featured Myra Hapi Smith, Bill Merito and George Ormond.

The film addresses mistrust and prejudice between Pākehā and Māori in New Zealand, portraying a romance between a Pākehā man and a Māori woman. The film was somewhat controversial at its release.

Cast

Plot
The film is about the relationship between Tom Sullivan, a Pākehā journalist, and Rawi, a Māori woman. Sullivan meets Rawi while researching articles on rural Māori life, and he stays for a time with Rawi's family. Rawi's family disapproves of her relationship with a Pākehā man, ending in a quarrel. Later, however, the two are re-united in the city, where Rawi goes to work as a nurse. The two resume their romance, but this time meet with opposition from Sullivan's family and friends, who do not wish him to be involved with a Māori woman. Sullivan eventually comes to agree with their views, and the couple separate once again. Sullivan has a change of heart, however, when he is saved from a fire by a Māori friend's sacrifice. Sullivan and Rawi are reunited.

Production
The film was the first real attempt at a feature film to be produced in New Zealand since the end of World War II and was filmed on a shoestring budget, and as such was fairly rudimentary and naive, yet was also important at re-establishing the New Zealand film industry.

References

External links

1952 films
1950s New Zealand films
1950s English-language films
New Zealand drama films
1952 drama films